Chingmy Yau Suk-zing (born 16 May 1968) is a retired Hong Kong actress.

Background
She entered the Hong Kong film industry after completing secondary school in the 1987 Miss Hong Kong Beauty Pageant.

She was one of the leading actresses in the late 1980s and early 1990s, next to Maggie Cheung, Brigitte Lin and Cheung Man. She was cast in a series of Category III films, though she never appeared nude in any of them.  The most notable of these was Naked Killer (1992).  During the height of her success, she regularly starred alongside superstars like Jet Li, Andy Lau, Stephen Chow, Ekin Cheng, and Jackie Chan.

Yau received four Hong Kong Film Award nominations for her acting:  for Best Supporting Actress in 1992 for Lee Rock, and for Best Actress in 1993 for Naked Killer, in 1996 for I'm Your Birthday Cake, and in 1999 for Hold You Tight.

Personal life
In 1999, she married Hong Kong fashion designer Sham Kar Wai, founder of Hong Kong-based fashion company I.T. They have three daughters together.

Partial filmography

 Hold You Tight (1998)
 Lawyer Lawyer (1997)
 Feel 100%...Once More (1996)
 4 Faces of Eve (1996)
 Bodyguards of Last Governor (1996)
 Street Angels (1996)
 Satan Returns (1996)
 Young and Dangerous 2 (1996)
 Blind Romance (1996)
 I'm Your Birthday Cake (1995)
 Legendary Couple (1995)
 High Risk aka Meltdown (1995)
 The Saint of Gamblers (1995)
 Lover of the Last Empress (1995)
 1941 Hong Kong on Fire (1995)
 God of Gamblers Returns (1994)
 Return to a Better Tomorrow (1994)
 Modern Romance (1994)
 Modern Love (1994)
 The New Legend of Shaolin (1994)
 Kung Fu Cult Master (1993)
 Raped by an Angel (1993)
 Psycho Killer (Yu ye tian mo) (1993)
 Millionaire Cop (1993)
 Legend of the Liquid Sword (1993)
 Ghost Lantern (1993)
 Future Cops (1993)
 Boys Are Easy (1993)
 City Hunter (1993)
 Royal Tramp II (1992)
 Royal Tramp (1992)
 Truant Heroes (1992)
 She Starts the Fire (1992)
 Naked Killer (1992)
 Deadly Dream Woman (1992)
 Casino Tycoon 2 (1992)
 Casino Tycoon (1992)
 Tricky Brains (1991)
 Money Maker (1991)
 Lee Rock II (1991)
 Lee Rock (1991)
 My Neighbors are Phantoms (1990)
 The Romancing Star III (1989)
 Perfect Match (1989)
 They Came to Rob Hong Kong (1989)
 Mr. Fortune (1989)
 Ghost Busting (1989)
 Happy Together (1989)
 The Crazy Companies II (1988)
 The Crazy Companies (1988)
 How To Pick Girls Up (1988)
 The Inspector Wears Skirts'' (1988)

– Sources:,

Awards and nominations

References

External links
Website about Chingmy Yau

 hkcinemagic entry
 lovehkfilm entry

20th-century Hong Kong actresses
1968 births
Living people
Hong Kong Buddhists
Hong Kong film actresses